Buckaroo from Powder River is a 1947 American Western film directed by Ray Nazarro and written by Norman S. Hall. The film stars Charles Starrett, Eve Miller, Forrest Taylor, Paul Campbell and Smiley Burnette. The film was released on October 14, 1947, by Columbia Pictures.

Plot

Cast           
Charles Starrett as Steve Lacey / The Durango Kid
Eve Miller as Molly Parnell
Forrest Taylor as Pop Ryland
Paul Campbell as Tommy Ryland
Smiley Burnette as Smiley Burnette
Bert Dodson as Bass Player 
Fred S. Martin as Accordion Player 
Jerry Scoggins as Guitar Player

References

External links
 

1947 films
1940s English-language films
American Western (genre) films
1947 Western (genre) films
Columbia Pictures films
Films directed by Ray Nazarro
American black-and-white films
1940s American films